The Willows Hotel at 112 S. Broadway in Linton, North Dakota, United States, was built in 1922.  It was listed on the National Register of Historic Places in 1996.  Also known as the Hogue Building, it is in Early Commercial architecture style.

According to its NRHP nomination, "Willows Hotel is an early North Dakota example of a commercial structure that was the product of international experimentation, using the reinforced concrete method of construction."  It was the city of Linton's first fireproof commercial building.

References

Buildings designated early commercial in the National Register of Historic Places
Hotel buildings completed in 1922
Hotel buildings on the National Register of Historic Places in North Dakota
National Register of Historic Places in Emmons County, North Dakota
1922 establishments in North Dakota